Dolna Koznitsa is a village in Nevestino Municipality, Kyustendil Province, south-western Bulgaria.

References

Villages in Kyustendil Province